Eighteen and Anxious is a 1957 American drama film directed by Joe Parker and written by Katherine Eunson and Dale Eunson. The film stars William Campbell, Martha Scott, Jackie Loughery, Jim Backus, Ron Hagerthy, and Jackie Coogan. The film was released on November 15, 1957, by Republic Pictures.

Plot

Judy Graham, just 18 years old, elopes to Mexico with boyfriend Jack, only to have him killed there. Judy returns to the disapproval of mother Lottie and stepfather Harvey, as well as disbelief from Jack's parents, the Baynes, who doubt the girl's story and accuse her of loose morals.

Judy realizes she is pregnant. Her older friend Ava and she go to Tijuana to find the marriage license, but no paperwork for a "Bayne" is found. She eventually gives birth to a baby boy, but does not wish to see him. Lottie has a change of heart and cares for the child. Jack's parents discover the wedding license in their son's belongings, mistakenly listed as "Payne", and forgive Judy, but she is appalled by their hypocrisy.

After finding a job and beginning a relationship with a boy, Danny Fuller, a smooth talker named Pete Bailey seduces her, only to jilt Judy on what she believes is her wedding day. A car she mistook as a marriage gift is actually a goodbye from Pete, who abandons her. A distraught Judy gets into a car crash. Danny rescues her from the wreck, expressing his hope that everyone will make up to Judy for their previous behavior toward her.

Cast      
 William Campbell as Pete Bailey
 Martha Scott as Lottie Graham
 Jackie Loughery as Ava Norton
 Jim Backus as Harvey Graham
 Ron Hagerthy as Danny Fuller
 Jackie Coogan as Harold 'Eager' Beaver
 Mary Webster as Judy Graham Bayne
 Charlotte Wynters as Mrs. Warren
 Yvonne Craig as Gloria Dorothy McCormick
 Katherine Barrett as Mrs. Wayne
 Damian O'Flynn as John Bayne
 Trustin Howard as Morty 
 Hal Smith as Abortionist
 Joyce Andre as Girl #1

References

External links 
 

1957 films
American drama films
1957 drama films
Republic Pictures films
Films scored by Leith Stevens
Films set in Tijuana
1950s English-language films
1950s American films